Terrian Bass Woods is an American singer and songwriter. She is a Christian music recording artist. She is known for her role as a vocalist in TobyMac's band, Diverse City.

Career
Terrian released her debut song, "God With Us", in 2019. The music video has since surpassed three million views on YouTube. It was followed by "In The Arms", co-written by Terrian and Anthony Skinner, Jon Reddick and songwriter Jess Cates, and was produced by Micah Kuiper and Bryan Fowler. She was also featured on TobyMac's remix album The St. Nemele Collab Sessions on the track, "It's You (Tide Electric Remix)" with Matt Maher. In addition to Terrian joined Cochren & Co. on the "TobyMac Theatre Tour".

Her third lead single, "Let Love Lead", was released on February 14, 2020. Followed by "You Still Do" on May 15, 2020.

She released her first EP, Genesis of Terrian, in 2021.

Personal life 
Terrian married on September 17, 2018 to Ian Woods.

She serves on AngelStreet Staff as a mentor to young girls and advocates for the nonprofit organization.

Discography

Extended plays

Singles

As lead artist

As featured artist

Notes

References

External links
 
 

21st-century American women singers
21st-century Christians
American performers of Christian music
Performers of contemporary Christian music
Living people
Singer-songwriters from Tennessee
American women singer-songwriters
Year of birth missing (living people)
21st-century American singers